Cardella is a surname. Notable people with the surname include:

 Jon Cardella, American businessman
 Lara Cardella (born 1969), Italian writer
 Phil Cardella (born 1976), American mixed martial arts fighter

See also
 Cardelli

Italian-language surnames